A redneck joke is a joke about rednecks—working-class, rural, southern white Americans.  For example,

These jokes can be a form of classism, depending on the teller. Jeff Foxworthy is a comedian that specializes in telling redneck jokes. For example:

"If you've ever cut your grass and found a car, you might be a redneck."
"If you've ever been too drunk to fish, you might be a redneck."
"If you've ever made change in the offering plate ... guilty ... you might be a redneck."

See also
Hillbilly
Three Wolf Moon
Blonde joke

References

Appalachian culture
Society of Appalachia
Culture of the Southern United States
Ethnic humour
Joke cycles
Ozarks
Stereotypes of rural people
Stereotypes of the working class
Stereotypes of white Americans